Brion is one of the 21 municipalities (municipios) that makes up the Venezuelan state of Miranda and, according to a 2007 population estimate by the National Institute of Statistics of Venezuela, the municipality has a population of 56,699. The town of Higuerote is the municipal seat of the Brion Municipality.

Demographics
The Brion Municipality, according to a 2007 population estimate by the National Institute of Statistics of Venezuela, has a population of 56,699 (up from 48,976 in 2000). This amounts to 2% of the state's population. The municipality's population density is 171.8 people per square mile (106.78/km2).

Government
The mayor of the municipality is Liliana Coromoto Gonzalez Guachi chosen on November 23, 2008, triumphing with 48% of the votes and his her opponent Raimundo Teran with 40% and volume posecion on December 1, 2008, defeating Raúl Ceballos.

Mayors of the municipality and political organizations which have governed (1989 onwards) 

Manuel González: (1989-1992) COPEI (Committee of Political Electoral Independent Organization) 
Domingo Palacios: (1992-2000) (Independent) 
Ramón Ramos: (2000-2004) COPEI-Electors of Miranda 
Raúl Ceballos: (2004-2008) PPT (Motherland For All)-PSUV (United Socialist Party of Venezuela) 
Liliana González: (2008) PSUV (United Socialist party of Venezuela)

References

Municipalities of Miranda (state)